DJ Turner (born November 9, 2000) is an American football cornerback for the Michigan Wolverines.

Early years
Turner attended North Gwinnett High School in Suwanee, Georgia before transferring to IMG Academy in Bradenton, Florida for his senior year. He committed to the University of Michigan to play college football.

College career
Turner appeared in eight total games his first two years at Michigan in 2019 and 2020. In 2021, he played in all 14 games and made eight starts. He finished the year with 33 tackles, two interceptions and one touchdown. Turner returned as a starter in 2022.

References

External links
Michigan Wolverines bio

2000 births
Living people
Players of American football from Georgia (U.S. state)
American football cornerbacks
Michigan Wolverines football players
IMG Academy alumni
Players of American football from Atlanta